Geitodoris reticulata is a species of sea slug or dorid nudibranch, a marine gastropod mollusk in the family Discodorididae.

Distribution
This species occurs in the Atlantic Ocean off Cape Verde.

Description

Ecology

References

Discodorididae
Gastropods described in 1906
Gastropods of Cape Verde